Caroline Helen Theobald  is the managing director, Bridge Club Ltd., Newcastle upon Tyne. In 2007, she was awarded the Queen's Award for Enterprise Promotion.

She was appointed Commander of the Order of the British Empire (CBE) in the 2016 New Year Honours for services to business and entrepreneurship.

References

Queen's Award for Enterprise Promotion (2007)
British businesspeople
Living people
Commanders of the Order of the British Empire
Year of birth missing (living people)